The Eastern religions are the religions which originated in East, South and Southeast Asia and thus have dissimilarities with Western, African and Iranian religions. This includes the East Asian religions such as Confucianism, Taoism, Chinese folk religion, Shinto, and Korean Shamanism; South Asian religions such as Hinduism, Buddhism, Jainism, and Sikhism; and Southeast Asian religions such as Vietnamese folk religion as well as animistic indigenous religions.

This East-West religious distinction, just as with the East-West culture distinction, and the implications that arise from it, is broad and not precise. Furthermore, the geographical distinction has less meaning in the current context of global transculturation.

While many Western observers attempt to distinguish between Eastern philosophies and religions, this is a distinction that does not exist in some Eastern traditions.

Indic religions

Also known as Dharmic religions, these are the religious sects originating in the Indian subcontinent, which includes Hinduism, Buddhism, Jainism, Sikhism, etc. The theologies and philosophies of these religions have several concepts in common, such as dharma, karma, maya and samsara.

Hinduism

Hinduism originated on the Indian subcontinent and was related to many other religious traditions outside the subcontinent, in places like ancient Central Asia and ancient Iran. It is considered by some to be the world's oldest extant major religion. Some consider Hinduism to originate from the Indus Valley civilization along with animism of the pre-Harappan migrants as well as the Indo-Aryan migrants. Hinduism contains a vast body of scripture, divided as revealed and remembered, expounding on dharma, or religious living. Hindus consider the Vedas and the Upanishads as being among the foremost in authority, importance and antiquity. It is difficult to identify any universal belief or practice in Hinduism, although prominent themes include: Dharma, Samsara, Karma, and Moksha. Hinduism is sometimes called a polytheistic religion, but this is an oversimplification. Hinduism includes a diverse collection of schools whose beliefs span monotheism, polytheism, pantheism, monism and even atheism. For instance, the Advaita Vedanta school holds that there is only one causal entity (Brahman), which manifests itself into all the various living and non-living forms that we observe, whereas traditions such as Vaishnavism and Shaivism worship Vishnu and Shiva in a relatively more monotheistic sense (caused by a differentiation between the parabrahman and atman). A number of scholars even consider the Samkhya school of thought to have atheistic leanings.

Buddhism

Buddhism is a nontheistic Indian religion and philosophy. Buddhism was founded around the 5th century BCE in Nepal by Siddhartha Gautama, the Buddha, with the Four Noble Truths and the Eightfold Path as its central principles. According to the scriptures, the Four Noble Truths were revealed by the Buddha in his first sermon after attaining enlightenment. The schools of Buddhism are typically divided into Theravada, Mahayana and Vajrayana. In academic circles, Mahayana is further divided into East Asian and Tibetan Buddhism. Buddhism teaches that someone who becomes enlightened without instruction is a buddha. The primary goal of Buddhism is the liberation of the practitioner from samsara. Buddhists hold this to be the solution to the problem of suffering.

Jainism

Jainism is the religion of the followers of the Jinas or Tirthankars (torch bearers and spiritual teachers of dharma). Parshvanatha and Mahavira, the 23rd and 24th Tirthankars, respectively, revived the Jain religion and re-organized the shraman sangha. Jains highlight the practice of austerity. Jain philosophy states that the jiva, or soul, can escape the cycle of rebirth and death by freeing itself from karmic bondages. When nothing remains but the purity of the jiva, that person is called a jina, or winner, which is the origin of the term Jain. Karma is viewed as an accumulation that burdens the soul, causing attachment and suffering. Ahimsa, or non-violence, is central to Jain faith, philosophy and practice. It is interpreted very strictly as prohibiting all forms of harm to other living beings. Due to this, Jainism requires a strict vegetarian lifestyle. Ahimsa also applies to speaking, as one's words can cause harm and suffering.

Sikhism

Sikhism is a religion which began in Punjab of Northern India. It is founded on the teachings of Guru Nanak Dev and the nine human gurus that followed. He received a vision to preach the way to enlightenment and God in Sultanpur. His views rejected the traditional worships and caste of the Hindu faith. Freedom from reincarnation is tied to remembrance and repetition on one universal God. In Sikhism, God is Nirankar, a formless and shapeless one. Sikhs believe that there is one universal God who is the ultimate creator, sustainer, and destroyer. The Gurū Granth Sāhib are the central scriptures intended to preserve hymns and the teachings of the Sikh Gurus and other saints from Hindu and Sufi traditions. Rituals, religious ceremonies or empty worship are considered of little use and Sikhs are discouraged from fasting or going on pilgrimages. The tenets of Sikhism include (1) honest living/earning (2) tithing and giving alms (3) chanting on God. Sikhism also has a strong warrior tradition which arose in defense of religious freedom and human rights from a tyrannical Moghul occupation of India.

East Asian religions

The group of East Asian religions or philosophies, also known as Taoic religions, may be considered as forming a group within world religions comparable to the Abrahamic or Dharmic groups. The Taoic faiths claim at least 500 million members worldwide.

Taoism

Taoism, also known as Daoism, comprises a variety of related religious and philosophical traditions. Categorization of Taoist sects and movements is very controversial. Taoist propriety and ethics places an emphasis on the Three Jewels of the Tao; love, moderation, humility. Taoist theology focuses on doctrines of wu wei ("non-action"), spontaneity, humanism, relativism and emptiness. 

Most traditional Chinese Taoists are polytheistic. Taoism or Daoism is a type of belief, or a way of thinking about life. It is at least 2,500 years old and it comes from China. Taoism is now said to be a philosophy. Tao (or Dao, 道) is the name of the force or the "Way" that Taoists believe makes everything in the world. There are disagreements regarding the proper composition of this pantheon. Popular Taoism typically presents the Jade Emperor as the head deity. Intellectual, or "elite", Taoism usually presents Laozi and the Three Pure Ones at the top of the pantheon. Nature and ancestor spirits are common in popular Taoism. But this sort of shamanism is eschewed for an emphasis on internal alchemy among the "elite" Taoists. Tao itself is rarely an object of worship, being treated more like the South Asian concept of atman.

Shinto

Shinto is an animistic folk religion practiced in Japan. Shinto literally means "the way of the gods". Many Japanese Shintoists also identify themselves as Buddhists. Japanese Pure Land Buddhism is deeply intertwined with the Shinto faith. Shinto practitioners commonly affirm tradition, family, nature, cleanliness and ritual observation as core values. Taoic influence is significant in their beliefs about nature and self-mastery.

Ritual cleanliness is a central part of Shinto life. Shrines have a significant place in Shinto, reflecting the animistic veneration of the kami. "Folk", or "popular", Shinto places an emphasis on shamanism, particularly divination, spirit possession and faith healing. "Sect" Shinto is a diverse group including mountain-worshippers and Confucian Shintoists.

Confucianism

Confucianism is a complex system of moral, social and political thought, influential in the history of East Asia. It is highly debated amongst scholars whether Confucianism is a religion or simply an ethical system. The Chinese Communist Party does not recognize it as a religion. It is commonly associated with legalism but it rejects legalism for ritualism. It also endorses meritocracy as the ideal of nobility. Confucianism has a complicated system governing duties and etiquette in relationships. Confucian ethics focus on familial duty, loyalty and humaneness. 

There are organizations that specifically promote Confucianism as a religion in Indonesia (Supreme Council for the Confucian Religion in Indonesia) and Hong Kong (Confucian Academy).

Confucianism tolerates the Chinese folk recognition of the existence of animistic spirits, ghosts and deities. It approves paying them proper respect, but at a more fundamental level encourages avoiding them. Confucian thought is notable as the framework upon which the syncretic Neo-Confucianism was built.

Shamanism and Animism
Shamanism and Animism have historically been practised in Asia, and is still practiced in most of Asia.

Northeast Asia 
 Mongolian shamanism
 Korean shamanism
 Ainu religion
 Ko-Shintō
 Turkic Shamanism

China 
 Chinese shamanism
 Manchu shamanism 
 Northeast China folk religion
 Nuo folk religion
 Bon

Southeast Asia 
 Đạo Mẫu
 Burmese Folk Religion

Others

Chinese 

 Chan Buddhism
 Chinese salvationist religions
 Xiantiandao
 Yiguandao
 Falun Gong
 Luoism
 Wang Hao-te
 Yao folk religion

Dravidian 
 Dravidian folk religion

Japanese 

 Japanese Buddhism
 Ryukyuan religion
 Shinto
 Shugendō
 Tenrikyo

Korean 

 Cheondoism
 Daejongism
 Daesun Jinrihoe
 Gasin faith
 Jeung San Do
 Seon Buddhism
 Suwunism
 Won Buddhism

Meivazhi

Nāstik (Heterodox Indian) 
 Ajivika
 Ajñana
 Buddhism
 Charvaka
 Jainism

Nepalese religions 

 Bön (Tibet / Nepal)
 Kirat Mundhum
 Newar Buddhism

Tai and Miao 

 Ahom religion
 Mo religion (Zhuang Shigongism)
 Tai folk religion

Tibeto-Burmese 
 Bon
 Burmese folk religion
 Benzhuism
 Bimoism
 Bathouism
 Bongthingism
 Donyi-Polo
 Heraka
 Kiratism
 Qiang folk religion
 Sanamahism

Sarnaism

Vietnam 

Vietnamese folk religion is the largest religion in Vietnam  with about 45.3% of the Vietnamese population[1] that are associated with this religion.

 Caodaism
 Đạo Bửu Sơn Kỳ Hương
 Đạo Dừa
 Đạo Mẫu
 Hòa Hảo

Secularization

Historical

Charvaka (Historical)

Din-I Ilahi (Historical)

See also
 Comparative religion
 Eastern culture
 Folk religion
 Tengrism
 Historical Vedic religion
 Zoroastrianism

Notes

References
 De Bary, William Theodore & Tu, Weiming. Confucianism and Human Rights. Columbia University Press (1998). .
 Fisher, Mary Pat. Living Religions: An Encyclopaedia of the World's Faiths. I.B. Tauris (1997). .
 Flood, Gavin D. An Introduction to Hinduism. Cambridge University Press (1996). .
 
 Huang, Siu-chi. Essentials of Neo-Confucianism: Eight Major Philosophers of the Song and Ming Periods. Greenwood Press (1999). .
 Leaman, Oliver. Key Concepts in Eastern Philosophy. Routledge (1999). .
 LaFargue, Michael. Tao and Method: A Reasoned Approach to the Tao Te Ching. SUNY Press (1994). .
 Markham, Ian S. & Ruparell, Tinu. Encountering Religion: an introduction to the religions of the world. Blackwell Publishing (2001). .
 Maspero, Henri. Translated by Frank A. Kierman, Jr. Taoism and Chinese Religion. University of Massachusetts (1981).
 Morgan, Diane. The Best Guide to Eastern Philosophy and Religion. St. Martin's Griffin (2001). .
 Ono, Sakyo. Shinto: The Kami Way. Tuttle Publishing (2004). .
 Pilgrim, Richard B. Buddhism and the Arts of Japan. Columbia University Press (1999). .
 Rausch, Thomas P. & Chapple, Christopher Key. The College Student's Introduction to Theology. Liturgical Press (1993). .
 Segal, Robert Alan. The Blackwell Companion to the Study of Religion. Blackwell Publishing (2006). .
 Sharot, Stephen. A Comparative Sociology of World Religions: virtuosos, priests, and popular religion. NYU Press (2001). .
 Slingerland, Edward Gilman. Effortless Action: Wu-Wei as Conceptual Metaphor and Spiritual Ideal in Early China. Oxford University Press (2003). .
 Smart, Ninian. World Philosophies. Routledge UK (2000). .
 Swami Bhaskarananda. The Essentials of Hinduism. Viveka Press (1994). .
 Weightman, Simon. Hinnells, John (ed). Handbook of Living Religions. Penguin Books (1997). . 
 Yao, Xinzhong. An Introduction to Confucianism. Cambridge University Press (2000). .
 York, Michael. Pagan Theology: Paganism as a World Religion. NYU Press (2005). .

Religion in Asia
Comparative religion